Rafhan is a Pakistani food brand of Unilever and one of the biggest food brands in Pakistan. The brand is mainly used by Pakistani Unilever for corn oil and desserts. It produces the corn oil, cornflour, custard, ice cream, jelly and pudding.

Rafhan brand was established by CPC International and was later acquired by Unilever.

History
It was established as a company named, Rafhan Best Foods Limited, in 1997 and was subsequently listed on the stock exchange of Pakistan. It is known for products such as Knorr, Energile, Glaxose-D, and Rafhan.

In 2007, Rafhan Best Foods Limited was renamed as Unilever Foods Pakistan Limited.

References

External links 
  brand at Unilever Pakistan

Unilever brands
Pakistani brands
Companies listed on the Pakistan Stock Exchange
1997 establishments in Pakistan